Now Gallery was a New York City art gallery based in East Village, Manhattan active from 1983 - 1989. It was a cultural concept of artist and art curator, Jacek Tylicki.

Co-operating with Fashion Moda in the Bronx and along with the Fun Gallery, Now Gallery introduced New York Street art and Graffiti into the mainstream art world. The Now Gallery initiated the East Village art boom of the 1980s.

Among others, artists exhibited in the Now Gallery 1983 - 1989 included:

Jean-Michel Basquiat
Mike Bidlo
Stefan Eins
Ron English
Adam Cvijanovic
John Fekner
Rodney Greenblat
Keith Haring
Mark Kostabi
Greer Lankton
Kevin Larmee
Valery Oisteanu
Stefan Roloff
James Romberger
Willoughby Sharp
Leonid Sokov
Krzysztof Wodiczko
Martin Wong

References

External links
 Now Gallery

Contemporary art galleries in the United States
Defunct art museums and galleries in Manhattan
Art galleries established in 1983
Art galleries disestablished in 1989
1983 establishments in New York City
1989 disestablishments in New York (state)
East Village, Manhattan